Bartonella schoenbuchensis is a bacterium from the genus Bartonella which was isolated from the fly Lipoptena cervi, also known as the deer ked. Bartonella schoenbuchensis from deer ked can cause dermatitis in humans.

References

External links
Type strain of Bartonella schoenbuchensis at BacDive -  the Bacterial Diversity Metadatabase

Bartonellaceae
Bacteria described in 2001